The Auto Expo is a biennial automotive show held in Greater Noida, NCR, India.

Till 2012, the Auto Expo was organized at Pragati Maidan, New Delhi which combined both vehicles and components. In 2014, The Auto Expo (Motor Show) moved to the new venue in NCR Region at the India Expo Mart, Greater Noida Uttar Pradesh. However, The Auto Expo (Components) continued at the Pragati Maidan, New Delhi. Both the Motor Show and the Components are organised jointly by the Automotive Component Manufacturers Association (ACMA), Confederation of Indian Industry (CII) and Society of Indian Automobile Manufacturers (SIAM).

History

Origin 
The Auto Expo was conceived in the year 1985 and had its debut showcasing in 1986. The Auto Expo 1986 was a window for technology transfers showing how the Indian Automotive Industry was absorbing new technologies and promoting indigenous research and development for adapting these technologies for the rugged Indian conditions. The Auto Expo 1986 was marked by then Prime Minister Rajiv Gandhi. The 9 day show was organised from 3 to 11 January 1986 at Pragati Maidan, New Delhi.

Accreditation 
The Auto Expo is accredited by the Organisation Internationale des Constructeurs d'Automobiles (OICA)

16th Auto Expo 2023 
The 16th Auto Expo was held at the India Expo Mart in Greater Noida between 11 and 18 January 2023. The interaction days for the domestic and international media, were opened from 11 January to 12 January 2023. All the gates of the 2023 Auto Expo open from 11 am to 6 pm every day. The 2023 Auto Expo focuses on new auto technologies as well as innovation. The following brands took part in the event:

Ashok Leyland
Atul Auto
Cummins
Godawari Electric Motors
Greaves Cotton
Hexall Motors
Hyundai
JBM Auto
Jupiter Electric Mobility
Kia
Maruti Suzuki
MG Motor
MTA E-Mobility
Omega Seiki Mobility
Tata Motors
BYD Auto
SML Isuzu
Toyota
Lexus
Pravaig Dynamics
Switch Mobility
VE Commercial Vehicles
Volvo Buses
Eicher Motors
Tork Motors
TVS Motor Company

Concept cars 
The concept cars displayed during Auto Expo 2023:
 eVX - Maruti Suzuki
 Hilux Extreme Off-Road - Toyota
 EV9 - Kia
 Curvv - Tata Motors
 Avinya - Tata Motors
 Sierra.ev - Tata Motors
 Harrier.ev - Tata Motors 
 LF-30 - Lexus
 LFZ - Lexus
 Glanza Racing - Toyota

Production Spec Cars 
The production spec cars displayed during Auto Expo 2023:

 Punch CNG - Tata Motors
 Altroz CNG - Tata Motors
 Altroz Racer - Tata Motors
 Carens Police Car - Kia
 Carens Ambulance - Kia
 KA4 (Carnival) - Kia
 Fronx - Maruti Suzuki
 Jimny - Maruti Suzuki
 Land Cruiser J300 - Toyota
 Carens - Kia 
 Innova Hycross - Toyota
 Grand Vitara - Maruti Suzuki
 Brezza - Maruti Suzuki
 Ertiga - Maruti Suzuki
 Baleno - Maruti Suzuki
 WagonR Flex Fuel - Maruti Suzuki
 Urban Cruiser Hyryder - Toyota
 Ioniq 6 - Hyundai
 Ioniq 5 - Hyundai
 Alcazar - Hyundai
 Nexo - Hyundai
 Tucson - Hyundai
 Atto 3 - BYD
 Seal - BYD
 e6 - BYD
 Seltos X Line - Kia
 Sonet X Line - Kia
 EV6 - Kia
 Seltos - Kia
 Sonet - Kia
 Harrier Red Dark - Tata Motors
 Safari Red Dark - Tata Motors
 Hector - MG Motor
 Mifa 9 - MG Motor
 Astor - MG Motor
 Gloster - MG Motor
 ZS EV - MG Motor
 Marvel R - MG Motor
 Hector Plus - MG Motor
 eMG6 - MG Motor
 eHS - MG Motor
 MG4 - MG Motor
 MG5 - MG Motor
 Euniq 7 - MG Motor
 eRX5 - MG Motor
 Camry - Toyota
 Fortuner - Toyota
 Fortuner Legender - Toyota
 Vellfire - Toyota
 bZ4X - Toyota 
 Mirai - Toyota 
 RX 500h - Lexus
 RX 350h - Lexus
 LX 500d - Lexus
 LM 350 - Lexus
 Tiago.ev - Tata Motors
 Tiago.ev Blitz - Tata Motors

Not Participating
Those not taking part in the event include the likes of Volkswagen, Nissan, Honda Cars, Citroën, Bajaj and Royal Enfield, Mahindra, Skoda, Volvo, Lamborghini, Porsche, Audi, Renault, Jeep, Jaguar Land-Rover, Mercedes-Benz, Hero MotorCorp, KTM, Honda 2W . Two-wheeler majors Harley Davidson and Triumph and truck makers Scania. The major reasons cited for their non-participation are the non-availability of specific Indian models and the poor return on investments.

15th Auto Expo 2020 
The 15th Auto Expo was held at the India Expo Mart in Greater Noida between 7 and 12 February 2020. The interaction days for the domestic and international media, were opened from 5 February to 6 February 2020. All the gates of the 2020 Auto Expo open from 11 am to 6 pm every day. The 2020 Auto Expo focuses on new auto technologies as well as innovation. The following brands took part in the event:

Force Motors
Great Wall Motors and Haval
Haima Automobile
Hyundai
Kia Motors
Mahindra
Maruti Suzuki
Mercedes-Benz
MG Motor
Renault
Škoda Auto
Tata Motors
Volkswagen
Omega Seiki Mobility

Due to a slow down in the Indian motor industry, the organiser had considered postponing the show to 2021. Several manufacturers declined to take part including BMW, Fiat, Ford, Honda and Toyota.

Concept cars 
The concept cars displayed during Auto Expo 2020:
 Futuro E - Maruti Suzuki
 Funster - Mahindra
 XUV300 EV - Mahindra
 Le fil Rouge - Hyundai
 Sonet - Kia Motors
 Marvel X - MG Motor
 Vision I - MG Motor
 ID Crozz - Volkswagen
 Taigun - Volkswagen (Pre-Production)
 Vision IN - Škoda
 Sierra - Tata Motors
 HBX - Tata Motors(Pre-Production)
 Kite - Hyundai
 RS 2027 - Renault
 SYMBIOZ - Renault
 Concept H - GWM Haval
 Vision 2025 - GWM Haval

Production Spec Cars 
The production spec cars displayed during Auto Expo 2020:
F7 - GWM Haval
F7X - GWM Haval
F5 - GWM Haval
H9 - GWM Haval
Ora R1 - GWM
 IQ - GWM
New Creta - Hyundai
 Tucson Facelift - Hyundai
 I30 Fastback N - Hyundai
 Hector Plus - MG Motor
 Gloster - MG Motor
 G10 - MG Motor
 Carnival - Kia Motors
 X Ceed - Kia Motors
 Stonic - Kia Motors
 E Niro - Kia Motors
 Soul EV - Kia Motors
 Vitara Brezza Facelift - Maruti Suzuki
 Ignis Facelift - Maruti Suzuki
 Jimny - Maruti Suzuki
 Atom - Mahindra
 E KUV100 - Mahindra
 K-ZE - Renault
 Zoe EV - Renault
 Triber AMT - Renault
 Gravitas - Tata Motors
 New Winger - Tata Motors
 Altroz EV - Tata Motors
 Hexa Safari Edition - Tata Motors
 Tiguan All-Space - Volkswagen
 T-Roc - Volkswagen
 Superb Facelift - Škoda
 Karoq - Škoda
 7X - Haima
 8S - Haima
 Bird E1 - Haima

14th Auto Expo 2018 
The 14th Auto Expo, the biggest event of the automotive industry in India, was held from 9–14 February 2018.

Like the previous edition, this show is divided into:
 Auto Expo 2018 - The Motor Show: scheduled from 9–14 February 2018 (at India Expo Mart, Greater Noida, Uttar Pradesh)
 Auto Expo 2018 - Components: scheduled from 8–11 February 2018 (at Pragati Maidan, New Delhi)
However, the joint inauguration of Auto Expo 2018 was held on 8 February.

Major Contributors
Among the major contributors to the EV segment, Tata is expected to launch two new electric cars, namely Tiago EV and Tigor EV. In addition to EVs, manufacturers like Tata Motors, Maruti Suzuki, Mahindra, BMW, Hyundai, etc. are expected to showcase their products.

Two Wheelers
In the two-wheelers segment, Hero MotoCorp is expected to offer a wide range of electric scooters, along with some new non-electric bikes. One can see the major two-wheeler manufacturers like BMW, Honda, TVS, Kawasaki, Suzuki and UM Motorcycles to showcase their new products in series.

Concept Cars
Maruti Suzuki has already announced the e-survivor and Future-S concepts to be showcased at Auto Expo 2018. Other concepts on display will be Trezor Concept and Concept EQ from Renault.

Driver-less technology 
Hi Tech Robotic Systemz launched AI based driver state monitoring system technology called Novus Aware in partnership with Daimler India Commercial Vehicles (DICV) for their BharatBenz Truck.

Not Participating
Those not taking part in the event include the likes of Volkswagen, Nissan, Bajaj and Royal Enfield, Datsun, Skoda, Volvo, Ford, Lamborghini, Porsche, Audi, Fiat, Jeep, Jaguar Land-Rover. Two-wheeler majors Harley Davidson and Triumph and truck makers MAN and Scania. The major reasons cited for their non-participation are the non-availability of specific Indian models and the poor return on investments.

13th Auto Expo 2016
The Auto Expo 2016 or 13th Auto Expo.  The Auto Expo is the biennial (once every two years)  automotive show of India and second largest auto show of the world, held in the National Capital Region of Delhi.

This show was divided into:
 Auto Expo 2016 - The Motor Show: held from 5–9 February 2016 (at India Expo Mart, Greater Noida, Uttar Pradesh)
 Auto Expo 2016 - Components: held from 4–7 February 2016 (at Pragati Maidan, New Delhi)

Organisers 
The Organisers of the Auto Expo 2016 were:
 Automotive Component Manufacturers Association of India (ACMA)
 Confederation of Indian Industry (CII)
 Society of Indian Automobile Manufacturers (SIAM)

The motor show received accreditation from the Organisation Internationale des Constructeurs d'Automobiles (OICA).

Exhibitors 
The following brands have taken part in the Auto Expo 2016:

 Abarth
 Ashok Leyland
 Atul Auto
 Audi India
 Bird Retail Pvt. Ltd.
 BMW India
 Chevrolet
 Datsun
 DSK Motowheels Pvt Ltd
 Eicher Motors
 Executive Modcar Trendz
 FCA India Automobiles
 Force Motors
 Ford India Private Limited
 Fiat India Automobiles
 Greenrick
 General Motors India Private Limited
 Hero MotoCorp
 Hindustan Petroleum
 Honda Cars India
 Honda Motorcycle and Scooter India (P) Ltd.
 Hyundai Motor India Limited
 India Yamaha Motor
 Indian Motocycle Manufacturing Company
 Isuzu Motors India 
 JBM Auto Ltd.
 Jaguar Land Rover
 Lohia Auto Industries
 Mahindra & Mahindra
 Maruti Suzuki
 Mercedes-Benz India
 Motormind Automotive Designs
 Nissan Motor India Private Limited
 Piaggio India
 Polaris India Pvt. Ltd.
 Renault India Private Limited
 Revolta Motors India
 Speedways Electric
 Scania Commercial Vehicles India Pvt. Ltd.
 SML Isuzu India
 Speego Vehicles India
 Suzuki India
 Tata Motors
 Toyota Kirloskar Motor
 Triumph Motorcycles India Pvt Ltd
 TVS Motor Company
 UM India Two Wheelers (P) ltd.
 VE Commercial Vehicles Pvt. Ltd.
 Volkswagen Group Sales India

Concept cars 
The concept cars displayed during the Auto Expo 2016:
 Audi Prologue 
 Chevrolet Cruze
 Chevrolet Spin
 Datsun Go-Cross
 Honda Accord
 Honda BR-V
 Hyundai Carlino 
 Hyundai N 2025 Vision Gran Turismo
 Hyundai Tucson

 Isuzu D-Max V-cross 
 Jeep Grand Cherokee
 Mahindra XUV Aero
 Maruti Suzuki Ignis
 Mercedes Benz GLC-Class
 Renault Duster Facelift
 Renault KWID AMT
 Tata Hexa
 Toyota Innova Crysta
 Toyota Prius
 Volkswagen Passat GTE
Novus Drive by Hi Tech Robotic Systemz

Car launches 
New cars launched at the 13th Auto Expo 2016:

 Audi R8 V10 Plus
 BMW X1 (F48)
 Jaguar XE
 Maruti Suzuki Vitara Brezza (Unveiled)

Two wheeler showcase
 Honda Navi
 Renegade Commando
 Renegade Sport S 
 Renegade Classic 
 Suzuki Gixxer SF FI
 Triumph Bonneville T120
 Yamaha MT-09

12th Auto Expo 2014 

The 12th Edition of the Auto Expo was divided into two events:

 12th Auto Expo 2014 (Components) which was held at Pragati Maidan, New Delhi from 6 to 9 February 2014.
 12th Auto Expo 2014 (The Motor Show) which was held at India Expo Mart, Greater Noida, Delhi-NCR from 7 to 11 February 2014, with press preview days on 5 and 6 February.

Production car launches

 Abarth 500 (Indian introduction)
 Ashok Leyland Dost Tipper
 Ashok Leyland MiTR
 Ashok Leyland Partner
 Audi A3 Cabriolet (Indian introduction)
 Audi A3 Sedan (Indian introduction)
 Bajaj RE60
 BMW 3 Series Gran Turismo (Indian introduction)
 BMW i8 (Indian introduction)
 BMW M6 Gran Coupe (Indian introduction)
 BMW X5 (Indian introduction)
 Chevrolet Beat facelift (Indian introduction)
 Chevrolet Camaro ZL1 (Indian introduction)
 Chevrolet Corvette Stingray (Indian introduction)
 Chevrolet TrailBlazer (Indian introduction)
 Datsun Go/Go+ (Indian introduction)
 DC Avanti
 Fiat Linea facelift (Indian introduction)
 Ford Fiesta facelift (Indian introduction)
 2014 Ford Figo
 Honda Accord Hybrid (Indian introduction)
 Honda Jazz (Indian introduction)
 Honda Mobilio (Indian introduction)
 Hyundai Santa Fe (Indian introduction)
 Hyundai Xcent
 Isuzu D-MAX Space Cab (Indian introduction)
 Isuzu NHR (Indian introduction)
 Jaguar F-Type (Indian introduction)
 2014 Jaguar XJ (Indian introduction)
 2014 Land Rover Discovery (Indian introduction)
 Mahindra e2o with Quick2Charge
 Mahindra Loadking Zoom container
 Mahindra Quanto autoSHIFT
 Mahindra Torro 25
 Mahindra Tourister Cosmo 40 seater
 Maruti Celerio
 Maruti Swift Sport (Indian introduction)
 Maruti SX4 S-Cross (Indian introduction)
 Mercedes-Benz GLA-Class (Indian introduction)
 Mercedes-Benz M Guard (Indian introduction)
 Mercedes-Benz CLA 45 AMG (Indian introduction)
 MINI John Cooper Works (Indian introduction)
 Nissan Evalia facelift
 Nissan Sunny facelift
 Range Rover Long Wheelbase
 2014 Range Rover Evoque with 9-speed AT (Indian introduction)
 Renault Duster Adventure Edition
 Renault Fluence facelift (Indian introduction)
 Renault Koleos facelift (Indian introduction)
 Renault Megane RS facelift (Indian introduction)
 Renault Zoe (Indian introduction)
 SsangYong Rodius (Indian introduction)
 SsangYong Rexton 2.0L (Indian introduction)
 Škoda Yeti facelift (Indian introduction)
 Tata Ace Zip XL
 Tata Bolt
 Tata LPS 4923 Lift Axle tractor
 Tata Prima CX 1618.T
 Tata Prima 4032.S LNG
 Tata Ultra 614
 Tata Starbus Urban FE Parallel Hybrid Bus
 Tata Starbus Urban 9/18 FE Articulated Bus
 Tata Zest
 Toyota Corolla Altis (Indian introduction)
 Toyota Etios Cross
 Toyota GT86 (Indian introduction)
 Toyota Hiace (Indian introduction)

Concept car launches

 Audi Sport quattro concept (Indian introduction)
 Bajaj U-Car
 Chevrolet Adra
 Datsun redi-GO
 Fiat Avventura
 Ford Figo sub-4 meter sedan
 Honda NSX (Indian introduction)
 Honda Vision XS-1
 Hyundai HND-9
 Jaguar C-X17 (Indian introduction)
 Mahindra eMaxximo EV
 Mahindra Halo EV
 Mahindra M1 Electro Formula E race car
 Mahindra Verito EV
 Mahindra XUV500 diesel hybrid
 Maruti Ciaz
 Maruti Swift Range Extender (Indian introduction)
 Nissan Friend-ME (Indian introduction)
 Nissan GT-R GT500 race car (Indian introduction)
 Piaggio NT3 concept (Indian introduction)
 Renault KWID
 SsangYong LIV-1 (Indian introduction)
 Tata ADDVenture
 Tata ConnectNext
 Tata Magic Iris Electric
 Tata Nano Twist Active
 Tata Nano Twist F-Tronic
 Tata Nexon
 Tata Safari Storme Ladakh
 Tata Sumo Extreme
 Volkswagen Taigun

Two Wheeler launches

 Aprilia Caponord 1200 (Indian introduction)
 Aprilia RSV4 R ABS (Indian introduction)
 Bajaj Pulsar SS400 and CS400
 DSK Hyosung Aquila 250
 DSK Hyosung GD 250N
 DSK Hyosung RT125 D
 Harley-Davidson Street 750 (Indian introduction)
 Hero Dare 125cc scooter
 Hero Hastur
 Hero iON Hydrogen-fuel cell vehicle concept
 Hero Passion Pro TR
 Hero SimplEcity electric bike
 Hero Splendor Pro Classic Cafe Racer
 Hero ZIR 150cc scooter
 Honda Activa 125
 Honda CBR 650F
 2014 Honda CBR1000RR SP
 2014 Honda CB Trigger
 Honda CX01 concept
 2014 Honda Dream Yuga
 Mahindra Cafe Racer concept
 Mahindra Mojo
 Mahindra Scrambler concept
 Moto Morini Granpasso (Indian introduction)
 Moto Morini Scrambler (Indian introduction)
 Moto Guzzi California 1400 Touring (Indian introduction)
 2014 Moto Guzzi V7 (Indian introduction)
 Piaggio Liberty 125 (Indian introduction)
 Rexnamo Electric SuperCruiser
 Suzuki Gixxer
 Suzuki Let's
 Suzuki V Strom 1000 ABS (Indian introduction)
 Terra A4000i electric scooter (Indian introduction)
 Terra Kiwami electric motorcycle
 Terra T4 electric riskshaw (Indian introduction)
 Triumph Daytona 675 (Indian introduction)
 TVS Draken concept
 TVS Graphite concept
 TVS Scooty Zest 110 cc scooter
 TVS Star City+
 TVS Wego
 UM Renegade Commando
 UM Renegade Sport
 UM XTreet
 Vardenchi T5
 Vespa 946 (Indian introduction)
 Vespa S (Indian introduction)
 Yamaha Alpha 110 cc scooter
 Yamaha FZ-S concept
 Yamaha R25 concept (Indian introduction)
 Yamaha YZF-R15 Special Edition

11th Auto Expo 2012 
The 11th Edition of Auto Expo was held at Pragati Maidan, New Delhi from 5 to 11 January 2012. The first 2 days of the event was reserved for Media and VIPs. The formal inauguration happened on 6 January 2012 and the event was open to general public from 7 to 11 January 2012. The largest automotive show in India saw around 1500 participants from 23 countries.

The 11th Edition of Auto Expo saw 50 car launches, 10 of them were global launches and 20 two-wheeler launches. For the first time Ferrari and Peugeot showcased their line-up for India.

Production car launches

Concept car launches

Two Wheeler launches

10th Auto Expo 2010 
The Silver Jubilee edition of Auto Expo happened from 5 to 11 January 2010 witnessed nearly 72 launches. This included more than 10 global launches comprising passenger vehicles and two-wheelers.

The show was inaugurated by Mr Kamal Nath,  Minister of Road Transport & Highways, Government of India and Mr Vilasrao Deshmukh, Minister of Heavy Industries and Public Enterprises. The show was also visited by media from over 19 countries.

Production and Concept car launches 

 Volkswagen Polo
 Tata Aria
 Skoda Yeti
 Fiat Punto Trendz
 Jaguar XJ
 Honda Brio
 Toyota Etios Sedan and Hatchback
 Hyundai i10 electric concept
 Chevrolet Aveo CNG
 Chevrolet Beat
 Audi Q7
 Maruti Suzuki Kizashi
 Fiat Linea T-Jet
 Chevrolet Captiva Extreme
 Chevrolet e-Spark
 Maruti Eeco
 Mahindra Thar

Two Wheeler launches 
 Honda CB Twister
 Hero Honda Karizma ZMR
 Kawasaki Ninja 250R
 TVS Wego
 Bajaj Pulsar 135
 Yamaha Fazer (India)
 TVS Apache RTR 180
 TVS Jive
 Royal Enfield Classic 350
 Bajaj Pulsar 220

9th Auto Expo 2008 
9th Edition of Auto Expo saw the launch of the much awaited and eagerly anticipated Tata Nano.  The expo happened from 10 to 17 January 2008, it attracted 1.8 million visitors and generated business worth Rs. 20,000 Crores through 2000 exhibitors and the display area was 1.2 Lakh square. The event had 65 manufacturers and more than 1,900 auto component makers. More than 31 new product / facelift and 4 global launches happened during the expo.

Production/Concept Car Launches 
 Tata Nano
 Chevrolet Captiva
 Mercedes C-Class
 Mercedes-Benz CLK-Class
 Audi A4
 Skoda Fabia
 Tata Sumo Grande
 Tata Indigo CS
 Tata Xenon
 Tata Indica Vista
 Volkswagen up! concept
 Volkswagen Jetta
 BMW M3 Coupe
 Bajaj small car concept
 Honda Jazz
 Honda Civic Hybrid
 Hyundai Santro LPG
 Maruti Ritz or Suzuki Splash
 Maruti Suzuki A-Star concept
 Chevrolet Adhra concept
 Mahindra Xylo
 Volvo S80
 Volvo XC60
 Volvo C70 Convertible

Two Wheeler launches 
 Honda Aviator
 Honda Unicorn CBF Concept
 Honda CBR600RR
 Kawasaki Ninja 1000R

8th Auto Expo 2006 
The 8th Auto Expo 2006 was organised at Pragati Maidan, New Delhi from 12 to 17 January 2006. With more than 1,000 participants, 300 overseas companies and 22 countries—including country-level participation from China, Germany, Italy, Taiwan and UK. The Expo covers an area of over 70,000 sq meters in New Delhi's Pragati Maidan.  The Expo was jointly organized by the Automotive Components Manufacturers Association of India (ACMA), the Confederation of Indian Industry (CII), and the Society of Indian Automobile Manufacturers (SIAM).

Production/Concept Car Launches 
 Mitsubishi Lancer Cedia
 Skoda Yeti Concept
 Skoda Superb
 Skoda Octavia RS
 Skoda Laura RS
 Honda FCX concept
 Honda CRV
 Honda Civic
 Honda City ZX CVT
 Mahindra Scorpio Hybrid
 Mahindra Bijilee Concept

7th Auto Expo 2004 
7th edition of Auto Expo spanned for 5 days from 7 to 11 January 2004. The key OEM exhibitors were Maruti, Hyundai, Tata Motors, Nissan, Skoda, Audi, Volkswagen and Daimler Chrysler. The display area was 10,300 m2.

6th Auto Expo 2002 
The 6th edition of the Auto Expo was held from 15 to 22 January 2002. The show witnessed international participation from 20 countries and exhibitors from China, the Czech Republic, France, Greece, Germany, Israel, Iran, Japan, Korea, Malaysia, Russia, Spain, Sweden, Switzerland, Taiwan, the UAE and the USA.

Production/Concept Car Launches 
 Fiat Palio
 Ashok Leyland Luxury buses
 Honda Scooters
 Hindustan Ambassador facelif
 Hyundai Santro facelift
 Tata Indigo Marina
 Skoda Fabia
 Toyota Qualis facelift
 Toyota Camry
 Hyundai Accent

5th Auto Expo 2000 
The 5th Edition of Auto expo was held in Pragiti Maidan from 12 to 18 January 2000. The event was inaugurated by Late.Mr.Murasoli Maran, Union Minister of Commerce and Industry. The expo covered 65,000 sq.m in display area through 18 halls and 20 participating countries. The expo had close to a million visitors and more than 25 new models were launched.

4th Auto Expo 1998 
The 4th Edition of Auto Expo was held at Pragati Maidan, New Delhi from 15 to 21 January 1998.

Production/Concept Car Launches 
 Tata Indica V1
 Daewoo Matiz
 Hyundai Santro
 Fiat Palio
 Skoda Felicia
 Ford Fiesta
 Maruti Zen
 Fiat Uno
 Daewoo Cielo
 Opel Astra
 Ford Escort
 Mitsubishi Lancer
 Honda City
 Tata Safari
 Tata Sierra
 Tata Sumo
 Mahindra Armada
 Mercedes E-Class

3rd Auto Expo 1996 
The 3rd Edition of Auto Expo was held at Pragati Maidan, New Delhi from 21 to 27 February 1996.  The event was inaugurated by the then Finance Minister of India, Dr. Manmohan Singh. The objective of the event was primarily to attract attention of global automotive players to enter India.

2nd Auto Expo 1993 
The 2nd Edition of Auto Expo was held at Pragati Maidan, New Delhi from 7 to 15 December 1993. The event was inaugurated by the then Minister of External Affairs of India, Pranab Mukherjee. The primary highlight of the event was the EU – India Automotive Business Forum.

See also 
 Auto Expo India: Miles and Milestones
 Organisation Internationale des Constructeurs d'Automobiles
 Yamaha R15 dan Yamaha R25 Motor Sport Racing dan Kencang

References

External links 

 Auto Expo Official site
 Auto Expo 2014 Photo Gallery
Auto Expo News
 Auto Expo luggage locker and Event Information

Auto shows in India
Biennial events
New Delhi
Transport in Delhi
Automotive industry in India